Lucas Gabriel Merolla (born 27 June 1995) is an Argentine footballer who plays as a central defender for Huracán.

Club career
Merolla was born in Buenos Aires, and joined Huracán's youth setup from Nueva Chicago. Promoted to the main squad for the 2016 season, he was an unused substitute in two first team matches before joining Primera B Metropolitana side Deportivo Español on loan.

Merolla made his senior debut on 28 August 2016, starting in a 1–0 home win over Defensores de Belgrano. He scored his first goal the following 2 April, netting his team's second in a 3–1 away success over Atlanta, and finished the season with three goals in 36 appearances as Deportivo Español reached the promotion play-offs but missed out after losing to eventual winners Deportivo Riestra.

On 28 August 2017, Merolla joined Primera B Nacional side Guillermo Brown. Again regularly used, he returned to Huracán in July 2018,  but only made his first team – and Primera División – debut for the club on 10 March 2019, playing the full 90 minutes in a 3–1 home loss against San Martín de Tucumán; it was his only league appearance of the campaign.

Merolla started to feature more regularly from September 2019, after manager Juan Pablo Vojvoda departed the club and interim Néstor Apuzzo took over; on 1 November, he renewed his contract until June 2023, with a US$ 20 million release clause. He scored his first goal in the top tier (and for the Quemeros) on 24 March 2021, netting the equalizer in a 1–1 draw at Atlético Tucumán.

In February 2023, Merolla was separated from the first team squad after failing to agree to a contract renewal.

Career statistics
.

Notes

References

External links

1995 births
Living people
Footballers from Buenos Aires
Argentine people of Italian descent
Argentine footballers
Association football defenders
Argentine Primera División players
Primera B Metropolitana players
Primera Nacional players
Club Atlético Huracán footballers
Deportivo Español footballers
Guillermo Brown footballers